Edward Perry White (April 6, 1926 – September 28, 1982) was an American professional baseball outfielder who played in three games for the Chicago White Sox during the 1955 Chicago White Sox season. He spent 8 seasons in the minor leagues with the Waterloo White Hawks, Memphis Chickasaws, Sacramento Solons and Minneapolis Millers.

External links

Venezuelan Professional Baseball League statistics

1926 births
1982 deaths
Alabama Crimson Tide baseball players
Baseball players from Alabama
Chicago White Sox players
Leones del Caracas players
American expatriate baseball players in Venezuela
Major League Baseball outfielders
Memphis Chickasaws players
Minneapolis Millers (baseball) players
Sportspeople from Anniston, Alabama
Sacramento Solons players
Waterloo White Hawks players